Demo 1983 is a compilation album by Brazilian post-punk band Mercenárias. Originally a demo tape recorded by the band in 1983, it was never made available to the general public until June 27, 2015, when it was fully remastered and released by independent label Nada Nada Discos.

The tracks "Polícia" and "Trashland" would be eventually re-recorded for Mercenárias' studio albums Cadê as Armas? and Trashland, respectively.

It is the only release of the band to feature original founding member Edgard Scandurra.

Track listing

Personnel
 Rosália Munhoz – vocals
 Sandra Coutinho – bass
 Ana Machado – guitar
 Edgard Scandurra – drums

References

External links
 Demo 1983 at Nada Nada Discos' official Bandcamp

2015 compilation albums
1983 albums
Mercenárias albums
Compilation albums by Brazilian artists
Demo albums